The Auckland Vulcans were an Auckland based rugby league club that participated in the New South Wales Cup. They were administered by the Rugby League Development Foundation. The team was selected from the Auckland Rugby League's Fox Memorial Competition and also used New Zealand Warriors squad members not selected for NRL duty. In 2007 the team was known as the Auckland Lions. In 2011 the Vulcans made their first appearance in a grand final, eventually going down to the Canterbury Bankstown Bulldogs. They were replaced in the NSW Cup in 2014 by the New Zealand Warriors, who submitted their own team.

Players

Four players have played for the Vulcans and the Junior Warriors and then gone on to make their National Rugby League debut with the New Zealand Warriors. They are Russell Packer, Daniel O'Regan, Sonny Fai and Leeson Ah Mau.

In addition to this Ukuma Ta'ai, Malo Solomona, Aidan Kirk and Corey Lawrie have all played for the Vulcans and then made their first grade debut for the Warriors.

In 2008 Ruben Wiki played in one match for the Vulcans.

Coaches
The Vulcans were coached by Bernie Perenara in 2008 and 2009, Brent Gemmel in 2010, Richie Blackmore in 2011, Ricky Henry in 2012 and Willie Swann in 2013.

See also

Rugby league in New Zealand
List of Auckland Vulcans Results

References

External links
 Official Website

Auckland rugby league clubs
Rugby clubs established in 2008
2008 establishments in New Zealand
2013 disestablishments in New Zealand
Diaspora sports clubs in Australia